Enanitos Verdes (literal translation: "Little green dwarves", roughly equivalent to the English phrase "Little green men") is a rock trio from Argentina, formed in 1979 in the city of Mendoza.

History
The band started in 1979, with Marciano Cantero (bass guitar, keyboards and vocals), Felipe Staiti (guitar) and Daniel Piccolo drums. That same year, they performed throughout the Cuyo region. Later they traveled to Buenos Aires to record a demo, with unusable results that were never released. In spite of this failure, they continued doing shows in Mendoza and in Buenos Aires.

In 1984 the band added two new members: Sergio Embrioni (guitar and vocals) and Tito Dávila (keyboard). As a quintet they published the disc Los Enanitos Verdes, with the hit "Aún sigo cantando" ("I'm still singing"). Embrioni left the band in 1985.

In 1986 they published their second album, entitled Contrarreloj (Counterclockwise), with the artistic production of Andrés Calamaro. The album included songs such as "Tus viejas cartas" ("Your old letters"), "Cada vez que digo adiós" ("Every time I say goodbye"), and "La muralla verde" ("The green wall"). Their third album Habitaciones extrañas (Strange Rooms) would arrive the following year. Produced again by Calamaro, it included "Te vi en un tren" ("I saw you in a train"), "Por el resto" ("For the rest") and "El extraño de pelo largo" ("The stranger with the long hair").

In 1988 they did an extensive tour, following in the footsteps of Miguel Mateos/Zas and Soda Stereo. During six months three particular concerts stood out: Viña del Mar (50,000 spectators), Mendoza, Argentina (35,000) and Santiago, Chile (32,000). In that same year they published their new LP, Carrousel. The song "Guitarras blancas" (white guitars) became one of the main hits of the album. A year later the group broke up, with Marciano Cantero starting his solo career. In 1992, the group got back together, recording the album Igual que ayer (Same as Yesterday).

In 1994 they released the album “Big Bang” on the record label EMI Latin. The album became a huge international success and includes what is perhaps their biggest hit “Lamento Boliviano”. The album also contains the rocker “Mejor No Hablemos de Amor” (Better Not Talk About Love) and the power ballad “Mi Primer Día Sin Tí” (My First Day Without You), all becoming fan favorites throughout their career.

In 1998 they released their album Tracción acústica, with the US record company Polygram. This album made them the first Argentine group and third Argentine artist to sign with a US company. This album was nominated for the Grammies in the category "Best Latin Rock Album".

They were part of the Watcha Tour 2000, which included seventeen shows along with Molotov, Aterciopelados, Café Tacuba and A.N.I.M.A.L.

In 2003, they went on tour with Alejandra Guzmán. They have, among other things, earned a Gaviota de Plata (Silver Gull) at the Festival de Viña del Mar in Chile. That same year they recorded their album Amores Lejanos with the hit single "Amores Lejanos".
In 2009 original member Daniel Piccolo (drummer) left the band. Jota Morelli from Fito Paez's band replaced him.
Former guitarist Sergio Embrioni committed suicide on February 17, 2011.

The band continued after this tragedy, going on tour in 2018 with Spanish group Hombres G across the United States.

On September 8, 2022 Marciano Cantero, the songwriter and frontman of Enanitos Verdes, died in the afternoon after a renal surgical procedure in a private hospital in his hometown of Mendoza, Argentina. He was 62.

Discography

Albums 
Los Enanitos Verdes (The Little Green Men, 1984, vinyl and cassette tape only, for Mordisco label)
Contrareloj (Counterclockwise, 1986, their first album for Sony BMG)
Habitaciones Extrañas (Strange Rooms, 1987)
Carrousel (1988)
Había una Vez (Once Upon a Time, 1989, last album for Sony BMG Argentina)
Igual que Ayer (Just Like Yesterday, gold album, 1992, first album for EMI)
Big Bang (1994, platinum album)
Guerra Gaucha (Gaucho War, 1996)
Planetario (Planetarium, 1997)Néctar (Nectar, 1999)Solo para Fanáticos (Only for Fanatics, 2001)Amores Lejanos (Distant Affairs, 2003)Pescado Original (Original Fish - a pun on the Spanish equivalent of Original Sin), 2006)Inéditos (2010)Tic Tac (2013)

 Live albums 

 Tracción Acústica (Acoustic Traction, 1998)
 En vivo (2004)
 Live At House of Blues, Sunset Strip (2011)
 Huevos revueltos (with Hombres G) (2018)

 Compilation albums 

 20 Grandes Éxitos (20 greatest hits, 1995)
 Recupera tus Clásicos'' (2010)

References

External links
 Enanitos Verdes official website
 Enanitos Verdes Bio
 
 

Argentine rock music groups
Rock en Español music groups
Musical groups established in 1979

es:Enanitos Verdes